Night in the Ruts is the sixth studio album by American rock band Aerosmith, released on November 16, 1979 by Columbia Records. Guitarist Joe Perry left the band midway through the album's recording.

The album was initially produced at the band's Warehouse rehearsal space by Jack Douglas, who'd produced Aerosmith's previous four albums, but later Columbia Records brought in Gary Lyons to replace Douglas as producer.

Background
Recording of the album began in the spring of 1979, but right from the beginning there were delays. Hampered by rampant drug use, vocalist Steven Tyler had difficulty completing lyrics and vocals. Bassist Tom Hamilton recalled: "We worked on the album, but we couldn't finish it. It was supposed to come out in June and be called Off Your Rocker, but there were no lyrics. It was a big crisis." The band members were also in dire financial straits, with guitarist Joe Perry owing the band $80,000 for room service, which he planned to repay by recording a solo album. The relationship between Aerosmith and Jack Douglas also became frosty and unstable when the producer divorced his wife, whom the band had liked. This, combined with weak sales of Draw the Line, led to Columbia stepping in, with Douglas reflecting in the band memoir Walk This Way, "The label finally put a lot of pressure on them. It was: "Look at these sales numbers. Come up with another hit or there's going to be trouble.' David [Krebs, Aerosmith's manager] thought I no longer exercised control over the band, which was true. No one did."

With the album still unfinished, the band was sent on tour to generate revenue, as they had burned through the budget allotment. This premature outing during the summer months pushed the album's release to later in the year. "Our management booked a tour," Hamilton noted, "leaving us just enough time to make the record, based on how long it'd taken us in the past, but we actually needed much more time. So we had to go on tour before the vocals were finished, and it was dragging on and on. Everyone was super-frustrated by it. It's ironic, because we were out on the road, playing stadiums to huge amounts of people, and yet the band was getting ready to die."

Substance abuse among the members gradually worsened, and they started fighting among themselves. This often led to missed and sloppy live performances, culminating in a fight involving the members and their wives. The situation came to a head on July 28, 1979, at the World Series of Rock in Cleveland, Ohio when Perry left the band halfway through the tour after a heated argument with Tyler. Prior to Perry's departure, he had completed guitar parts for "No Surprize", "Chiquita", "Cheese Cake", “Reefer Headed Woman”, "Three Mile Smile", and "Bone to Bone (Coney Island White Fish Boy)". Guitar parts for the remaining songs were recorded by Brad Whitford, Richie Supa, Neil Thompson, and Jimmy Crespo. (The last became Perry's official replacement from 1979 to 1984.) Perry's last session with the band was on May 30, 1979. He stated:

In his 2014 autobiography Rocks, Perry elaborated on his frustrations:

Recording and composition

Aerosmith spent the summer at Mediasound Studios in New York trying to finish off the album with producer Gary Lyons. The band caught a second wind when Tyler came up with lyrics for a song he had been composing with Perry that "told the story of the band," which became "No Surprize," a song that Tyler has cited as his favorite. In the band's 1997 memoir Walk This Way, Tyler shared his thoughts on several of the album's tracks:
 "No Surprize" - "For two months, I'd been totally blocked, writing lyrics for this track we had done with Joe. 'My name is nah nah nah, I come from Yonkers High, and I get drunk at night.' One night I had such a revelation to write the story of the band, how Aerosmith got started... I was so excited to be back on track."
 "Reefer Headed Woman" - "'Reefer Head Woman' was a 1940s blues record. I had the lyrics in a notebook that got stolen, and I had to call Dr. Demento from the Record Plant, where we finished the album, and the Doctor read the lyrics to me over the phone."
 "Bone to Bone (Coney Island White Fish Boy)" - I had to explain to the press that a Coney Island whitefish is a used rubber."
 "Mia" - "It was a lullaby I wrote on the piano for my daughter, but the tolling bell notes at the end of the song and the end of the album sounded more like the death knell of Aerosmith for people who knew what was going on."

Also included on the album was a cover of "Think About It," a Yardbirds B-side from 1968 that Aerosmith had occasionally played live through the 70s. Promo videos for "No Surprize" and "Chiquita" were filmed (featuring Jimmy Crespo). "Chiquita" is available on the band's Video Scrapbook VHS and laserdisc release.

The album title is a spoonerism for the phrase "right in the nuts," which is alluded to on the album's rear cover artwork.

Reception

Critical reception 

The album was panned by contemporary critics and despite some early success, it quickly fell down the charts. Rolling Stone writer David Fricke described the album's best tracks "like inspired outtakes from Rocks and Toys in the Attic", showing Aerosmith's return to their basic sound; however, he found "the deviations from this norm... disastrous, if not in concept then in execution," as in the cover of Shangri-Las ballad "Remember (Walking in the Sand)" "wavering inconsistently between hard rock and the Spectorian grandeur of the original". The Village Voice critic Robert Christgau considered the opening song "No Surprize" the only "promising" track on the album.

Critic Greg Prato of AllMusic offered a more charitable commentary in a historical context, calling it "a surprisingly coherent and inspired album. Although it's not up to par with such classics as Toys in the Attic or Rocks (although it could have been if the band weren't in such a state of turmoil at the time), it was definitely leaner and more focused than the [band's previous] studio release, Draw the Line." In his Collector's Guide to Heavy Metal, Martin Popoff found the album "a solid record" and a "triumph amidst adversity" which, even with the "band at its least energetic, coherent and cohesive", exudes "the canny genius of years spent welding modern flash rock to the blues."

Legacy 
Tyler has expressed great satisfaction with Night in the Ruts, calling it his favorite album and cryptically enthusing to Stephen Davis in 1997, "Heroin. Shooting coke. Eating opium and it was just... I love that albumNight in the Ruts. It's like a fuckin' solar eclipse." Perry also insisted to Guitar World in 1997, "We were still fucked up, but the record sounds more cohesive than Draw the Line. Night in the Ruts was a rockin' record."

Track listing

Personnel

Aerosmith
 Steven Tylerlead vocals, keyboards, harmonica, piano, cover art concept
 Joe Perryguitar, slide guitar and backing vocals on "No Surprize", "Chiquita", "Cheese Cake", "Three Mile Smile", “Reefer Headed Woman”, and "Bone to Bone (Coney Island White Fish Boy)"
 Brad Whitfordguitar
 Tom Hamiltonbass
 Joey Kramerdrums

Additional musicians
 Mary Weissbacking vocals on "Remember (Walking in the Sand)"
 Richie Supaadditional guitars on "No Surprize" and "Mia"
 Jimmy Crespolead guitar on "Three Mile Smile"
 George Youngalto saxophone on "Chiquita"
 Louis del Gattobaritone saxophone on "Chiquita"
 Lou Marinitenor saxophone on "Chiquita"
 Barry Rogerstrombone on "Chiquita"
 Neil Thompsonguitar on "Chiquita"

Production
Gary Lyonsproducer with Aerosmith, engineer
David Krebs, Steve Leberexecutive producers, management
Peter Thea, Rod O'Brienassistant engineers
George Marinomastering at Sterling Sound, New York
John Berg, John Koshart direction, design
Jim Sheaphotography
Vic Anesiniremastering

Charts

Certification

References

Bibliography

External links
 

Aerosmith albums
1979 albums
Albums recorded at Record Plant (New York City)
Columbia Records albums